Papaya was an all girl pop group from South Korea. They released two albums before becoming inactive.

History
Papaya's first album, entitled 동화 ("Fairy Tale"), was distributed by 1 Star Music and Synnara Music on August 4, 2000, and featured five members (Kang Se-jung, Joo Yeun-jung, Cho Hye-kyung, Hwang Yoon-mi, and Kang Kyoung-ah). Due to their unpopularity, Hwang Yoon-mi and Kang Kyoung-ah left the group before the release of their second album, Violet, released on May 22, 2001, under the Cream Entertainment music label.

Members
 Kang Kyoung-ah (강경아) [2000]
 Joo Yeun-jung (주연정)
 Cho Hye-kyung (조혜경)
 Hwang Yoon-mi (황윤미) [2000]
 Kang Se-jung (강세정)

After disbandment

Kang Se-jung went on to acting, initially credited under stage name Go Na-eun. In 2009, she starred in Assorted Gems. She won the Excellence Award, Actress in the 2009 MBC Drama Awards for her role as eldest daughter, Gung Bi-chwi.

Hwang Yoon-mi also turned to acting and uses stage name Go Eun-chae. In September 2012, Go married musical actor Park Eun-tae.

Jo Hye-kyung became a Trot singer, using the stage name Jo Eun-sae. In 2014, she released single '비비고 (Rubbing)'.

Discography

Studio albums

References

K-pop music groups
South Korean girl groups
Musical groups established in 2000
Musical groups disestablished in 2001